Ksenia Lykina was the defending champion, but lost to Zarina Diyas in the quarterfinals. 

Magdaléna Rybáriková won the title, defeating Jang Su-jeong in the final, 6–2, 6–3.

Seeds

Draw

Finals

Top half

Bottom half

References
Main Draw

Fukuoka International Women's Cup - Singles
Fukuoka International Women's Cup